Fuson Canyon is a valley in Custer County, South Dakota, in the United States.

Fuson Canyon has the name of John Fuson, an early settler.

See also
List of rivers of South Dakota

References

Landforms of Custer County, South Dakota
Valleys of South Dakota